D'Andre Walker (born January 23, 1997) is a former American football linebacker. He played college football at Georgia. He was drafted by the Tennessee Titans in the fifth round of the 2019 NFL Draft.

Early years
Walker attended Langston Hughes High School in Fairburn, Georgia. He committed to the University of Georgia to play college football.

College career
Walker played at Georgia from 2015 to 2018. During his career, he had 112 tackles with 13.5 sacks.

Professional career

Tennessee Titans
Walker was drafted by the Tennessee Titans in the fifth round (168th overall) of the 2019 NFL Draft. He agreed to a four-year rookie contract worth $2,786,749 with a signing bonus of $266,749 and a 2019 cap hit of $561,687. He was placed on injured reserve on August 10, 2019.

Walker was waived by the Titans on September 5, 2020.

Seattle Seahawks
Walker was claimed off waivers by the Seattle Seahawks on September 6, 2020. He was waived on September 29, 2020.

References

External links
Georgia Bulldogs bio
 Tennessee Titans bio

1997 births
Living people
People from Fairburn, Georgia
Players of American football from Georgia (U.S. state)
Sportspeople from Fulton County, Georgia
American football linebackers
Georgia Bulldogs football players
Tennessee Titans players
Seattle Seahawks players